The Ridgway Area School District is a rural public school district serving parts of Elk County, Pennsylvania. It encompasses the communities of Ridgway, Ridgway Township, Spring Creek Township, and Horton Township. According to 2010 federal census data, it serves a resident population of 6,558.

Students in grades K-5 attend the elementary school, those in grades 6-8 attend the middle school, and those in grades 9-12 attend the high school.

Extracurriculars
Ridgway area School District offers a variety of clubs, activities and an extensive sports program.

Sports
The District funds:

Boys
Baseball - A
Basketball- AA
Cross country - A
Football - AA
Golf - AA
Soccer - A
 Wrestling	 - AA

Girls
Basketball - AA
Cross country - A
Golf - AA
Gymnastics - AAAA
Soccer (fall) - A
Softball - A
Volleyball - A

Middle school sports

Boys
Basketball
Cross country
Football
Soccer
Track and field
Wrestling	

Girls
Basketball
Cross country
Soccer (fall)
Track and field
Volleyball

According to PIAA directory February 2018

Music
Musical activities available to high school students include:
The "Mighty Elker" Marching Band, directed by Theresa Morley-Palmer
Concert Band (Class)
Concert Choir (Class)
Show Choir (Club)
HS Drama

References

School districts in Elk County, Pennsylvania